Carrollton Exempted Village Schools is a school district located in Carroll County, Ohio, United States. Carrollton High School, the only high school for the district, is located in Carrollton.

Schools
Carrollton Elementary, Carrollton, Ohio
Carrollton High School, Carrollton, Ohio

Former schools
Bell-Herron Middle School (closed in 2019, demolished)
Augusta Elementary, Augusta (closed in 2019, demolished)
Dellroy Elementary, Dellroy (closed in 2019, demolished)
Harlem Springs Elementary, Harlem Springs (closed in 2008)
Kilgore Elementary, Kilgore (built in 1891, joined the school district in 1959, closed in 2006, sold in 2008)
Willis Elementary, Mechanicstown (closed in 2008)

New school building 
Carrollton Exempted Village School District began construction of the new grades 6-12 school building with a groundbreaking ceremony on May 18, 2017. Shook Touchstone Construction headed the construction as part of the Ohio Facilities Construction Commission.  The building is at 205 Scio Road, Carrollton, OH 44615. The building opened to students on August 20, 2019.

See also
List of school districts in Ohio

References

External links
 District website

Education in Carroll County, Ohio
School districts in Ohio